Randall Hunt is a former American football coach.  He served as the interim head football coach at Glenville State College in 1984 and as the head football coach at Greensboro College from 2009 to 2011, compiling a career college football coaching record of 10–29. Hunt graduated in 1975 from Glenville State, where he was a four-year player for the Pioneers football team.

Head coaching record

References

Living people
Glenville State Pioneers football coaches
Glenville State Pioneers football players
Greensboro Pride football coaches
West Virginia University alumni 
Players of American football from Greensboro, North Carolina
Sportspeople from Greensboro, North Carolina
Year of birth missing (living people)